Victor Engstrom may refer to:

 Victor Engström (1989–2013), Swedish bandy player
 Victor E. Engstrom (1914–2000), philatelist